Mishkovskoye is a rural locality (a village) in Kharovskoye Rural Settlement, Kharovsky District, Vologda Oblast, Russia. The population was 5 as of 2002.

Geography 
Mishkovskoye is located 21 km southwest of Kharovsk (the district's administrative centre) by road. Kharenskoye is the nearest rural locality.

References 

Rural localities in Kharovsky District